Roberto Allemandi (born August 1, 1912, date of death unknown) was an Argentine professional football player. Born in Oliva, he also held Italian citizenship. He played 2 seasons (7 games, no goals) in the Serie A for A.S. Roma.

References

1912 births
Year of death missing
Argentine footballers
A.S. Roma players
Serie A players

Association football defenders